Mark Gainsford Slade (born 2 August 1958) is a British fencer. He competed at the 1980, 1984 and 1988 Summer Olympics. He was a three times British fencing champion, winning the sabre title at the British Fencing Championships in 1979, 1985 and 1988.

References

1958 births
Living people
British male fencers
Olympic fencers of Great Britain
Fencers at the 1980 Summer Olympics
Fencers at the 1984 Summer Olympics
Fencers at the 1988 Summer Olympics
People from Ingatestone